In Japan,  are the country's hot springs and the bathing facilities and traditional inns around them. As a volcanically active country, Japan has many onsens scattered throughout all of its major islands. There are approximately 25,000 hot spring sources throughout Japan that provide hot mineral water to about 3,000 genuine onsen establishments.

The presence of an onsen is often indicated on signs and maps by the symbol ♨ or the kanji  (yu, meaning "hot water"). Sometimes the simpler hiragana character ゆ (yu), understandable to younger children, is used.

Traditionally, onsens were located outdoors, although many inns have now built indoor bathing facilities as well. Nowadays, as most households have their own bath, the number of traditional public baths has decreased, but the number of sightseeing hot spring towns has increased (most notable ones including Kinosaki Onsen, and ). Onsens by definition use naturally hot water from geothermally heated springs.

Definition
Therefore, cold onsens do exist.

The Japanese Hot Springs Act states that the mineralized hot spring water that feeds an onsen must be at least 24°C/ 75°F originating at a depth of 1.5 kilometers, and contain specific amounts of minerals such as sulphur, sodium, iron or magnesium.

Mixed bathing

Traditionally, men and women bathed together at both onsens and sentōs, but gender separation has been enforced since the opening of Japan to the West during the Meiji Restoration.  persists at some special onsen in rural areas of Japan, which usually also provide the option of separate "women-only" baths or different hours for the two sexes. Japanoko Guide states that "during Post-World War II, when Japan decided to open its ports to other nations, laws against konyoku baths have been passed to lift the country’s image. Since many viewed bathing naked as lewd and vulgar, these laws especially targeted the konyoku nude Japanese bathhouse. On the other hand, there are still those who fight for the continuation of this practice claiming that this is a Japanese culture that must be treasured and maintained. Unfortunately, this did not prevent the slow fall of establishments with Onsen mixed-gender baths and is now treated as some of the rare places in the country." Men may cover their genitals with a small towel while out of the water, while women usually wrap their bodies in full-size towels. Children of either sex may be seen in both the men's and the women's baths.

Etiquette

Ensuring cleanliness
As at a sentō, at an onsen, all guests are expected to wash and rinse themselves thoroughly before entering the hot water. Bathing stations are equipped with stools, faucets, wooden buckets, and toiletries such as soap and shampoo; nearly all onsen also provide removable shower heads for bathing convenience. Entering the onsen while still dirty or with traces of soap on the body is socially unacceptable.

Swimsuits
Guests are not normally allowed to wear swimsuits in the baths. However, some modern onsen will require their guests to wear a swimming suit in their mixed baths.

Towel
Onsen guests generally bring a small towel with them to use as a wash cloth. The towel can also provide a modicum of modesty when walking between the washing area and the baths. Some onsen allow one to wear the towel into the baths, while others have posted signs prohibiting this, saying that it makes it harder to clean the bath. It is against the rules to immerse or dip towels in the onsen bath water, since this can be considered unclean. People normally set their towels off to the side of the water when enjoying the baths, or place their folded towels on top of their heads.

Noise
Onsen vary from quiet to noisy; some play piped music and often feature gushing fountains. Bathers will engage in conversation in this relaxed situation. There are usually prohibitions against rowdiness in the washing and bathing areas; however, a small amount of excess energy and splashing around is usually tolerated from children.

Tattoos
By 2015, around half (56%) of onsen operators had banned bathers with tattoos from using their facilities. The original reason for the tattoo ban was to keep out Yakuza and members of other crime gangs who traditionally have elaborate full-body decoration.

However, tattoo-friendly onsen do exist. A 2015 study by the Japan National Tourism Organisation found that more than 30% of onsen operators at hotels and inns across the country will not turn someone with a tattoo away; another 13% said they would grant access to a tattooed guest under certain conditions, such as having the tattoo covered up. Some towns have many tattoo-friendly onsen that do not require guests to cover them up. Two such towns are Kinosaki Onsen in Hyōgo and Beppu Onsen in Ōita.

With the increase in foreign customers due to growing tourism, some onsen that previously banned tattoos are loosening their rules to allow guests with small tattoos to enter, provided they cover their tattoos with a patch or sticking plaster.

Health
The volcanic nature of Japan provides plenty of springs. When the onsen water contains distinctive minerals or chemicals, the onsen establishments typically display what type of water it is. For many years people have believed that soaking in hot mineral spring water has health benefits.

Some examples of types of onsen include:

Risks
Article 18, paragraph 1 of the Japanese Hot Springs Act publishes guidance on contraindications and cautions for bathing in hot springs, and drinking their respective waters.  Although millions of Japanese bathe in onsens every year with few noticeable side effects, there are still potential side effects to onsen usage, such as aggravating high blood pressure or heart disease.

Legionella bacteria have been found in some onsens with poor sanitation. For example, 295 people were infected with Legionella and 7 died at an onsen in Miyazaki Prefecture in 2002. Revelations of poor sanitary practices at some onsens have led to improved regulation by hot-spring communities to maintain their reputation.

There have been reports of infectious disease found in hot bodies of water worldwide, such as various Naegleria species. While studies have found the presence of Naegleria in hot spring waters, Naegleria fowleri, responsible for numerous fatal cases of primary amoebic meningoencephalitis around the world, has not been found to be present in the water at onsens. Nevertheless, fewer than five cases have been seen historically in Japan, although not conclusively linked to onsen exposure.

Many onsens display notices reminding anyone with open cuts, sores, or lesions not to bathe. Additionally, in recent years onsens are increasingly adding chlorine to their waters to prevent infection, although many onsen purists seek natural, unchlorinated onsens that do not recycle their water but instead clean the baths daily. These precautions as well as proper onsen usage (i.e. not placing the head underwater, washing thoroughly before entering the bath) greatly reduce any overall risk to bathers.

Voyeurism is reported at some onsens. This is mitigated in some prefectures of Japan where nude mixed bathing is not permitted, visitors must wear swimsuits.

Selected onsen

Japan 

 

 Akagi, Gunma
 Akayu, Yamagata
 Arima Onsen, Kobe, Hyōgo
 Asamushi Onsen, Aomori Prefecture
 Aso, Kumamoto, a famous onsen area alongside Mount Aso, an active volcano
 , Atami, Shizuoka, major onsen resort town near Tokyo
 Awara Onsen, Awara, Fukui Prefecture
 Awazu Onsen, Komatsu, Ishikawa
 Beppu Onsen, Beppu, Ōita Prefecture, famous for its multi-coloured baths
 , Nihonmatsu, Fukushima
 Dōgo Onsen, Ehime Prefecture
 Funaoka Onsen, Kyoto
 , Gero, Gifu, famous for its free open bath on riverbank of Hida River
 Geto Onsen, Iwate Prefecture
 Ginzan Onsen, Obanazawa, Yamagata
 Hakone, Kanagawa, famous onsen resort town near Tokyo
 Hanamaki, Iwate
 , Takayama, Gifu
 , Shizuoka
 Ibusuki Onsen, Kagoshima Prefecture
 Iizaka Onsen, Fukushima
 , Ikaho, Gunma
 Itō, Shizuoka
 Iwaki Yumoto Onsen, Fukushima Prefecture
 Iwamuro, Niigata, famous for onsen since the Edo period
 Jigokudani, Nagano Prefecture
 , Hokkaido
 , Yonago, Tottori
 , Nagano
 , Shizuoka
 , Kaga, Ishikawa
 , Tanabe, Wakayama
 Kindaichi Onsen, Iwate
 Kinosaki, Hyōgo
 Kinugawa Onsen, Tochigi
 Kusatsu Onsen, Gunma Prefecture
 , Misasa, Tottori Prefecture
 Nagaragawa Onsen, Gifu, Gifu
 Nanki-Katsuura Onsen, Nachikatsuura, Wakayama
 Nanki-Shirahama Onsen, Shirahama, Wakayama Prefecture
 Naoshima, Kagawa Prefecture
 Naruko, Miyagi
 Noboribetsu, Hokkaido
 Nuruyu Onsen, Kumamoto Prefecture
 Nyūtō Onsen, Akita Prefecture
 Obama Onsen, Nagasaki Prefecture, the hottest Japanese hot spring
 , Hokkaido
 Ōfuka Onsen, Akita
 Ryujin Onsen, Tanabe, Wakayama, one of Japan's famous three beautifying onsen
 Sabakoyu Onsen, Fukushima Prefecture, the oldest community onsen in Japan
 Sakunami Onsen, Miyagi
 Sawatari, Gunma Prefecture
 , Niigata Prefecture
 Shima Onsen, Gunma Prefecture
 Shimabara, Nagasaki
 , Yamanashi Prefecture
 , Tochigi Prefecture
 Shuzenji Onsen, Shizuoka Prefecture
 , Hokkaido
 Sukayu Onsen, Aomori Prefecture
 , Shizuoka Prefecture
 Suwa, Nagano Prefecture
 Takanoyu Onsen, Akita Prefecture
 Takaragawa, Gunma, one of the largest outdoor mixed baths in Japan
 Takarazuka, Hyōgo
 Tara, Saga
 Tōyako, Hokkaidō
 , Niigata - famous for its free open mixed onsen
 Tsuchiyu Onsen, Fukushima Prefecture
 , Niigata Prefecture
 , Kanagawa
 Unazuki Onsen, Kurobe, Toyama Prefecture
 Wakura Onsen, Nanao, Ishikawa Prefecture
 Yamanaka Onsen, Kaga, Ishikawa
 Yamashiro Onsen, Kaga, Ishikawa
 , Okayama Prefecture, one of the largest mixed baths at the foot of Yubara dam
 , Nagano Prefecture
 Yufuin, Ōita Prefecture
 Yugawara, Kanagawa Prefecture
 Yumura Onsen, (Shin'onsen, Hyōgo)
 Yunogo Onsen, Okayama Prefecture
 Yunokawa Onsen, Hokkaido
 Yunomine Onsen, Tanabe, Wakayama, site of the UNESCO World Heritage Tsuboyu bath
 Yuzawa, Niigata
 Zaō Onsen, Yamagata Prefecture

Taiwan 

 

 Antong hot spring, Hualien County
 Beitou hot spring, Taipei City
 Hongye hot spring, Hualien County
 Guanziling hot spring, Chiayi County
 Jiuzhize Hot Spring, Yilan County

See also
 Ashiyu
 Balneotherapy
 Furo
 List of hot springs in Japan
 Public bathing
 Sauna
 Taiwanese hot springs
 Three Ancient Springs
 Turkish bath
 Onsen portal at the Japanese Wikipedia

Notes

References

Further reading
 Hotta, Anne, and Yoko Ishiguro. A Guide to Japanese Hot Springs. New York: Kodansha America, 1986. .
 Fujinami, Kōichi. Hot Springs in Japan. Tokyo: Board of Tourist Industry, Japanese Government Railways; Maruzen Company, Ltd., 1936.
 Neff, Robert. Japan's Hidden Hot Springs. Rutland, Vermont: Charles E. Tuttle, 1995. .
 Seki, Akihiko, and Elizabeth Heilman Brooke. The Japanese Spa: A Guide to Japan's Finest Ryokan and Onsen. Boston: Tuttle Publishing, 2005. . Reprinted as Ryokan: Japan's Finest Spas and Inns, 2007. .

External links

 Onsen Tipster A database of genuine onsen in Japan
 Sento Guide Guide to public baths in Japan
 OnsenJapan.net Interactive Google map with easy-to-read icons, pictures, and reviews
 Secret Onsen a database with more than 125 onsen all around Japan
 Japan Onsen A mountain onsen guide of the Japan Alps
 Japanbased Onsen guide A guide on how to onsen in Japan

Bathing in Japan
 
Public baths in Japan
Articles containing video clips